"Stick It Out" is a single released by the English pop group Right Said Fred. The single was released as part of the benefit of Comic Relief 1993 and issued by Gut Records under the Tug label name, with distribution by the Total Record Company. Credited on the label and by the Official Chart Company to "Right Said Fred and Friends", the single's cover has the record credited to "Right Said Fred & Hugh & Peter & Alan & Jools & Steve & Clive & Pauline & Linda & Richard & Rob & Basil & Bernard". This is because the "Friends" included Hugh Laurie, Peter Cook, Alan Freeman, Jools Holland, Steve Coogan, Clive Anderson, Pauline Quirke, Linda Robson, Sir Basil Brush and Bernard Cribbins.
The single reached number four on the UK Singles Chart in March 1993, staying in the Top 75 for a total of seven weeks and became the group's fourth top ten hit in the United Kingdom.

Chart positions

References

1993 singles
Right Said Fred songs
Comic Relief singles
1993 songs
Charisma Records singles
Songs written by Richard Fairbrass
Songs written by Fred Fairbrass
Songs written by Rob Manzoli